The 562nd Grenadier Division was an infantry division of Nazi Germany's Wehrmacht.

2nd Grenadier Division East Prussia 

The division was formed on 24 July 1944 at Stablack in Wehrkreis I (East Prussia) as the 2nd Grenadier Division East Prussia. The division had a mere four grenadier battalions. It had the following organisation:
Grenadier Regiment East Prussia 3
Grenadier Regiment East Prussia  4
Artillery Regiment East Prussia 2
Fusilier Company East Prussia 2
Tank destroyer Battalion East Prussia 2
Engineer Company East Prussia 2
Signal Company East Prussia 2

562nd Grenadier Division 
On 27 July, the division was renamed the 562nd Grenadier Division. All of its subordinate units were also renamed:
1144th Grenadier Regiment
1145th Grenadier Regiment
1562nd Artillery Regiment
562nd Fusilier Company
1562nd Tank Destroyer Battalion
1562nd Engineer Company
1562nd Signal Company

562nd Volksgrenadier Division 
On October 9, the division was upgraded to a Volksgrenadier division. By then, the division was already part of the Army Group Centre's 4th Army's LV Corps. The division fought at Augustavas and Narew. 

Finally, it fought on its home territory opposing the Red Army's East Prussian offensive. Most of the division was destroyed in the Heiligenbeil Pocket in March 1945. Only a small part of the division evacuated via the sea to the Hel peninsula together with the 4th Army. The division was disbanded on 16 April 1945 and its survivors were captured by the Soviets. The division's staff was later used as the staff of the 4th Reich Labour Service Division.

Commanders

References

Bibliography 

 

Military units and formations established in 1944
German grenadier divisions
Military units and formations disestablished in 1945